The following is a list of diocesan bishops and archbishops of Olomouc. Not much is known about the beginnings of the Diocese of Olomouc. It was reestablished in 1063 and in 1777 it was elevated to an archdiocese.

Bishops of Olomouc 
898/900–? Bishop from Rome
914–932 Jan (?)'
Vacant (?)
942–947 Silvestr (?), † 961
947–976 united with the Bishopric of Regensburg (?) 
976–981 Vratislav (?)
981–991 united with the Bishopric of Regensburg (?) 
991–1063 united with the Bishopric of Prague (?) 
 1063–1086 Jan I (Johann I von Brenau)
1086–1088 united with the Bishopric of Prague  (?) 
 1088–1091 Vezel
 1091–1096 Ondřej
1096–1099 Jindřich (?)
 1097/1099–1104 Petr I
 1104–1126 Jan II
 1126–1150 Jindřich Zdík
 1151–1157 Jan III of Litomyšl
 1157–1172 Jan IV
 1172–1182 Dětleb
 1182–1184 Pelhřim
 1184–1194 Kaim (Chaim von Böhmen)
 1194–1199 Engelbert von Brabant
 1199–1201 Jan V
 1201–1240 Robert
 1241–1245 Konrád of Freiberk
 1245–1281 Bruno von Schauenburg
 1281–1302 Dětřich
 1302–1311 Jan VI of Waldstein
 1311–1316 Petr II
 1316–1326 Konrád I
 1327–1333 Jindřich Berka of Dubá
 1334–1351 Jan Volek
 1351–1364 Jan Očko of Vlašim
 1364–1380 John of Neumarkt
 1381–1387 Petr III
 1387      Jan X Soběslav
 1388–1397 Mikuláš of Riesenburk
 1398–1403 Jan XI
 1403–1408 Ladislav of Kravaře
 1409–1412 Conrad of Vechta
 1412–1416 Václav Králík of Buřenice
 1416–1430 Jan XII Železný
 1416–1448 Also Slavatzki
 1430–1434 Konrád III of Zvole
 1434–1450 Pavel of Miličín
 1450–1454 Jan XIII
 1454–1457 Bohuslav of Zvole
 1457–1482 Protas Černohorský of Boskovice
 1483/4–1490 John Filipec
 1487–1489 Jan Vitéz mladší
 1489–1493 Ardicino della Porta
 1493–1497 Juan de Borja Lanzol de Romaní, el mayor
 1497–1540 Stanislav I Thurzo
 1540–1541 Bernard Zoubek of Zdětín
 1541–1553 Jan Dubravius
 1553–1565 Marek Khuen of Olomouc
 1565–1572 Vilém Prusinovský z Víckova
 1572–1574 Jan XVII Grodecký
 1574–1575 Tomáš Albín of Helfenburk
 1576–1578 Jan XVIII
 1579–1599 Stanislav II Pavlovský
 1599–1636 Franz von Dietrichstein
 1636–1637 Jan XIX Arnošt of Plattenstein
 1637–1662 Leopold Wilhelm
 1663–1664 Charles Joseph
 1664–1695 Karl II von Liechtenstein-Kastelkorn
 1695–1711 Charles Joseph of Lorraine
 1711–1738 Wolfgang Schrattenbach
 1738–1745 Jakob Ernst von Liechtenstein-Kastelkorn
 1745–1758 Ferdinand Julius Troyer of Troyerstein
 1758–1760 Leopold II Fridrich of Egkh 
 1761–1776 Maximilian Reichsgraf von Hamilton

Archbishops of Olomouc 
 1777–1811 Antonín Theodor Colloredo-Waldsee
 1811–1819 Maria Tadeáš Trauttmansdorff
 1819–1831 Rudolf von Habsburg-Lothringen
 1831–1836 Ferdinand Maria Chotek
 1836–1853 Maxmilián Josef Sommerau-Beckh
 1853–1892 Bedřich z Fürstenberka
 1893–1904 Theodor Kohn
 1904–1915 Franziskus von Sales Bauer
 1916–1920 Lev Skrbenský z Hříště
 1921–1923 Antonín Cyril Stojan
 1923–1947 Leopold Prečan 
 1948–1961 Josef Karel Matocha 
 bishop Josef Vrana (apostolic administrator 1973–1987)
 1989–1991 František Vaňák
 since 1992 Jan Graubner

Bishops of Olomouc
Olomouc
Olomouc
Bishops and archbishops of Olomouc
Archbishops of Olomouc